Men's artistic gymnastics qualification at the 2019 European Games was held at Minsk Arena on June 27. The results of the qualification determined the qualifiers to the finals: 18 gymnasts in the all-around final, and 6 gymnasts in each of 6 apparatus finals. Two gymnasts per country could qualify to the all-around final, and one gymnast per country could qualify to the apparatus finals.

Results

Individual all-around

Floor

Pommel horse

Rings

Vault

Parallel bars

Horizontal bar

References

Gymnastics at the 2019 European Games